Planet Dog Records is a small ambient/techno/breakbeat/psychedelic trance record label based in London, UK. It is part of the same organisation headed by Michael Dog (real name Michael Sassen) that ran Club Dog in London and the touring Megadog parties, and was created as a promotional vehicle for the participating artists. It was most active from 1993 to 1998, releasing recordings by Eat Static, Banco de Gaia, Children of the Bong, Timeshard, and Future Loop Foundation.

Many Planet Dog Records releases were re-released in the United States on Mammoth Records.

See also 
 List of record labels

References

External links
 

British record labels
Ambient music record labels
Techno record labels
Psychedelic trance record labels